Rendez-vous à Paris is a French comic book by Enki Bilal, and the third album of the tetralogy featuring Nike Hatzfeld.

References

 Sommeil du monstre editions Bedetheque

External links
Bilal publications in English on Humanoids Publishing

French comics
2006 in comics
Comics by Enki Bilal